Robert Wallace Wilkins (December 4, 1906 – April 9, 2003) was an American medical investigator and educator. He made many contributions in the research of hypertension and cardiovascular disease. He was the president of the American Heart Association in 1957 and received its Gold Heart Award in 1962.  Wilkins received the Albert Lasker Award in 1958 for his research.

He has been credited with introducing the antipsychotic and antihypertensive drug reserpine to the United States in 1950.

References

External links

American cardiologists
1906 births
2003 deaths
Harvard Medical School alumni
Recipients of the Lasker-DeBakey Clinical Medical Research Award
University of North Carolina alumni